National Coalition on Health Care (NCHC) is a coalition of groups working to achieve comprehensive health system reform. Founded in 1990 by Dr. Henry E. Simmons, M.D., NCHC is a non-profit alliance of more than 80 organizations.

The coalition has a stated commitment to building a national bipartisan consensus in support for enactment and implementation of sustainable, systemic and system-wide health care reform.

Coalition principles
The coalition's mission is grounded on five interdependent principles forming a framework for improving America's health care system:

 Health care coverage for all
 Cost management
 Improvement of health care quality and safety
 Equitable financing
 Simplified administration

Member organizations

The National Coalition on Health Care comprises the following member organizations.

Member organizations:
 AARP
 Adrian Dominican Sisters
 AFL–CIO
 American Academy of Family Physicians
 American Academy of Pediatrics
 American Association of Community Colleges
 American Association of State Colleges and Universities
 American Cancer Society
 American College of Cardiology
 American College of Emergency Physicians
 American College of Nurse Midwives
 American College of Surgeons
 American Council on Education
 American Dental Education Association
 American Federation of State, County, and Municipal Employees (AFSCME), AFL–CIO
 American Federation of Teachers
 American Federation of Television and Radio Artists
 American Heart Association
 American Legacy Foundation
 American Library Association
 American Lung Association
 Asian Pacific Islander American Health Forum
 Association of American Medical Colleges, Council of Teaching Hospitals and Health Systems
 Association of American Universities
 Breast Cancer Network of Strength
 C-Change
 California Public Employees' Retirement System (CalPERS)
 California State Teachers' Retirement System (CalSTRS)
 Children's Defense Fund
 CodeBlueNow!
 Colorado Public Employee Retirement Association
 Common Cause
 Partnership for Health Care Reform (Communication Workers of America)
 Consortium for Citizens with Disabilities
 Consumers Union
 Duke Energy
 Duke University Medical Center
 Easter Seals
 The Episcopal Church
 The Evangelical Lutheran Church in America
 Giant Food, Inc.
 Gross Electric, Inc.
 Illinois Municipal Retirement Fund
 Partnership for Health Care Reform (International Brotherhood of Electrical Workers)
 International Brotherhood of Teamsters Union
 International Federation of Professional and Technical Engineers, AFL–CIO
 International Foundation for Employee Benefit Plans
 Iowa Farm Bureau Federation
 Japanese American Citizens League
 Johns Hopkins Medicine
 League of Women Voters
 Maternity Center Association
 Michigan Health & Hospital Association
 Midwest Business Group on Health
 Motion Picture Association of America
 National Association for the Advancement of Colored People (NAACP)
 National Association of Childbearing Centers
 National Association of Independent Colleges and Universities
 National Community Action Foundation
 National Conference of Public Employee Retirement Systems
 National Consumers League
 National Coordinating Committee for Multi-Employer Plans
 National Council of Churches of Christ in the U.S.A.
 National Council of La Raza
 National Council on Teacher Retirement
 National Education Association
 National Multiple Sclerosis Society
 New York State Teachers' Retirement System
 Organization of Chinese Americans
 Presbyterian Church (U.S.A.)
 Religious Action Center of Reform Judaism
 Salvation Army
 Sheet Metal Workers' International Association, AFL–CIO
 Small Business Majority
 Stop & Shop, Inc.
 Teva Pharmaceutical Industries, Ltd.
 Union for Reform Judaism
 United Food and Commercial Workers International Union, AFL–CIO
 United Methodist Church – General Board of Church and Society
 United States Conference of Catholic Bishops
 U.S. PIRG
 Partnership for Health Care Reform (Verizon)

References

External links
 National Coalition on Health Care Website

Medical and health organizations based in Washington, D.C.
Healthcare reform advocacy groups in the United States